Gibbon Falls is a waterfall on the Gibbon River in northwestern Yellowstone National Park in the United States.

History
The falls were first described by William Henry Jackson during the second Hayden geological survey of 1872. There is no historical record as to how they got their name, but by the mid-1880s, they were routinely referred to as Gibbon Falls in both government and commercial accounts of the park.

In 1883, in his The Yellowstone National Park-A Manual for Tourists, Henry J. Winser described the falls:

In 1895, Hiram M. Chittenden described Gibbon Falls in his Yellowstone National Park-Historical and Descriptive.  In 1895, the road was on the opposite side of the river from where it runs today.

Barrier to fish migration
When the Washburn and Hayden parties traveled through the Firehole River and Gibbon River basins in the  1870s, the Gibbon River above Gibbon Falls was barren of fish, the falls being a natural barrier to upstream migration. Unlike the Yellowstone drainage, the upper Gibbon was isolated from any connection to drainages on the Pacific slope.  The absence of fish was overcome in 1890 when the first Rainbow trout were introduced into the river above the falls.  In 1920, Arctic Grayling, native in the Gibbon and Madison Rivers below the falls were stocked in Grebe Lake at the headwaters of the Gibbon. Today, the falls still block upstream migrations of spawning trout from the Madison River, but the upper Gibbon has become a consistent trout fishery because of these introductions.

See also

 Waterfalls in Yellowstone National Park

Notes

Waterfalls of Teton County, Wyoming
Waterfalls of Wyoming
Waterfalls of Yellowstone National Park
Tourist attractions in Teton County, Wyoming